Coca-Cola with Lime is a variation of the original Coca-Cola. It was introduced in North America in the first quarter of 2005, before being quietly discontinued in 2006. The formula is the same as regular Coke but with added lime flavor. The decision to market the product was based on popular feedback from consumers in 2004, with the release of Diet Coke with Lime. It continues to be produced in several European and Asian countries.

Markets
Coca-Cola with Lime was available in the United Kingdom in green bottles, as was other citrus flavour Coca-Cola with Lemon but in clear bottles the year before, as a limited summer edition in 2006. In 2020 it was brought back being branded as "Diet Coke Sublime Lime." Coca-Cola with Lime was also available in Denmark and Sweden, but is now discontinued. It was also tested in the Netherlands as limited summer edition 2005, and is now widely available in that country.

Coca-Cola with Lime is also available in Singapore. The Coca-Cola with Lime beverage was also given a limited edition run in Ireland along with the Diet version; however, now only the Diet Coca-Cola with Lime variety remains on sale in that country. Coca-Cola Citra is available in Japan.

Coca-Cola with Lime was briefly available in Australia, but proved quite unpopular with some larger retailers such as Woolworths and Coles, who bought in bulk, having to reduce the price considerably (50c for a 1.25 L bottle compared to around A$2 for all other varieties) in order to clear the product out. Diet Coke with Lime was discontinued in the United Kingdom, as was Diet Coke with Lemon in the beginning of 2007, having been renamed Diet Coke with Citrus Zest in 2007, which is mixture of lime and lemon taste.

Coca-Cola "Lime" is currently available to buy in Japan as of July 2021, in Romania as of October 2016 (in April 2019 is discontinued and replaced with Coca-Cola Lime Zero), in Poland as of March 2017, in Estonia as of June 2017, in Lithuania as of July 2017, in Russia as of March 2021, in Latvia and Canada as of January 2018, and in Austria as of July 2017.

Besides being sold in bottles, Coca-Cola with Lime can also be created in Coca-Cola Freestyle machines.

Advertisement
An advertisement of Coca-Cola with Lime first appeared on television during the March 7, 2005 broadcast of American Idol. The advert uses Harry Nilsson's hit song "Coconut" in an edited and slightly altered form with the mondegreen "You put the lime in the Coke, you nut."

References

External links 

 

Coca-Cola brands
Food and drink introduced in 2005
Discontinued soft drinks
Limes (fruit)
Citrus sodas

es:Coca-Cola con lima